Ahmadabad-e Vasat (also Romanized as Aḩmadābād-e Vasaţ; also known as Aḩmadābād and Aḩmadābād-e Kūzehgarhā) is a village in Behnamvasat-e Shomali Rural District of the Central District of Varamin County, Tehran province, Iran. At the 2006 National Census, its population was 2,493 in 586 households. The following census in 2011 counted 2,868 people in 781 households. The latest census in 2016 showed a population of 2,933 people in 887 households; it was the largest village in its rural district.

References 

Varamin County

Populated places in Tehran Province

Populated places in Varamin County